The 1922–23 Marquette Blue and Gold men's ice hockey season was the inaugural season of play for the program.

Season
Joining in with other midwestern schools, Marquette founded their program in 1922. The first order of business was hiring a coach and the administration was advised to hire George Grady. "Buck" was a Canadian who had played collegiately at the University of Saskatchewan before serving in the military during World War I. After the war he began coaching hockey and was player/coach of a team in Chicago when he accepted the position.

A team was quickly assembled with most players coming from the college of dental surgery. The first game was played against nearby Wisconsin and, though a loss, the team acquitted themselves well. The next two games versus Minnesota were the first home games for the Blue and Gold. Though they lost both, they were able to keep the score close against the Western Intercollegiate Champions. Marquette took that experience into the two final games against Wisconsin and were able to earn back-to-back ties. In the first of those two matches, tragedy nearly struck when goaltender Harold Garry collapsed during intermission. While he eventually recovered, Montagne was forced to take his place in goal. Dave Delaney was a late addition to the team, dealing with a knee injury, but made it into the lineup after Garry was forced to withdraw.

Roster

Standings

Schedule and results

|-
!colspan=12 style=";" | Regular Season

References

Marquette Golden Eagles men's ice hockey seasons
Marquette
Marquette
Marquette
Marquette